Vernon Parish (French: Paroisse de Vernon) is a parish located in the U.S. state of Louisiana. As of the 2020 census, the population was 48,750. The parish seat is Leesville. Bordered on the west by the Sabine River, the parish was founded in 1871 during the Reconstruction era.

It was long a center of the timber industry, which harvested pine in the hills and bottomland hardwoods. Construction of a railway to the area in 1897 stimulated marketing of lumber and businesses in the area.

Since World War II, Fort Polk has been most important to the parish economy. The population of the Leesville area rapidly increased fivefold after the fort was opened. Vernon Parish is part of the Fort Polk South, LA Micropolitan Statistical Area, which is also included in the DeRidder-Fort Polk South, LA Combined Statistical Area.

History
The area comprising Vernon was a part of a tract of land whose control was disputed in the late 18th century between the United States and Spain. They called this land the "Neutral Strip" and refrained from posting police or military personnel there. As a result, the area became a haven for outlaws. Prior to the United States acquisition of this territory through the Louisiana Purchase from France in 1803, the primary settlers who came to the area were ethnic French and Spanish.

During this period, Dr. Timothy Burr, a Massachusetts native who had migrated to Louisiana from Mt. Vernon, Ohio, established the community of Burr Ferry at his landing on the Sabine River. This community became known as the "Gateway to Louisiana" from the west. For decades this area was part of the Natchitoches, Rapides, and Sabine parishes, which were established soon after the US acquired this territory in the early nineteenth century. The timber industry was most important to the local economy, with both pines of the hills and bottomland hardwoods being harvested. Some landowners had their land cleared by slaves to establish plantations for cotton cultivation.

During the American Civil War, an artillery site was constructed nearby. Now called the "Confederate Breast Works", it was manned by the Confederacy to guard against Union movements along the Nolan Trace.

On March 30, 1871, the Louisiana General Assembly passed an act to create Vernon Parish, by taking territory from the three parishes noted above, as population had increased in the area. There are four versions of how the parish was named; the only official State version is that it was named in honor of Mt. Vernon, the home of George Washington.

Leesville was designated as the parish seat of Vernon from the start. It was incorporated February 15, 1900.  The city was founded by Dr. Edmund E. Smart, who donated land from his plantation for the development of the parish seat. It was named by Senator John Rowell Smart, his father, in honor of General Robert E. Lee.  The Big House from the Smart plantation still stands, where the city has grown up around it. It is located at what today is the corner of Lula and First streets.

Folklore accounts of the naming of the parish are: 1) that it was named after a race horse owned by Joe Moore, one of the members of the committee chosen to name the parish, who claimed that by naming the parish after his fast horse the committee would insure the growth of the parish:  2) that it was named after a popular teacher who had been an officer in the Royal Navy, only mentioned as "Mr. Vernon". The decision was made to avoid disputes among the parish founders, each of whom wanted to name it after himself. 3) The final account tells that the committee had been arguing over the name while drinking in a store. Trying to preserve his precious whiskey and profits, the host suggested the committee stop a local man passing by on a mule-drawn cart and name the parish whatever the man said was the mule's name. The man responded, "I calls him Vernon, 'cause he's the fastes' mule in de country."

In the late 1890s the timber industry, which was the dominant industry in the parish from its creation, began to boom with the construction of the Kansas City Southern Railway in 1897. It increased access to markets. The railway continues to operate in the early 21st century.

20th century to present
In the period after World War I, Vernon Parish became the site of two socialist-based communities. The Llano del Rio Cooperative Colony developed as New Llano, established in 1917. The second was the Christian Commonwealth Colony. These colonies attempted to attract economists and sociologists to conduct an experiment in communal membership and the sharing of labor duties. Llano del Rio was the larger community, with more than 10,000 people, and was also the longest-surviving. Both colonies failed in the 1930s during the economic stress of the Great Depression.

In 1941, the United States Army opened Camp Polk, shortly after the outbreak of war in Europe, with the German invasion of Poland and other actions. Camp Polk quickly surpassed the timber industry as the dominant force in the parish's economy.  After the camp opened, the population of the parish seat of Leesville rapidly climbed from 3,500 to 18,000. Named after Leonidas Polk, the first Episcopal Bishop in Louisiana and known as the "Fighting Bishop of the Confederacy", it served as one of the major Army training camps during World War II.

In the 21st century, Fort Polk is the 5th-largest military installation in the nation. The facility covers approximately 200,000 acres (800 km2). It has stimulated the development of associated businesses in the area and related populations. With the regular reassignment of soldiers, accompanied by dependents, to and from the fort, Vernon Parish has a more varied culture than might be expected from its location. Its residents come from all over the country.

Geography
It is the largest parish in Louisiana by land area.

Major highways
  U.S. Highway 171
  Louisiana Highway 8
  Louisiana Highway 10
  Louisiana Highway 28

Adjacent parishes and counties
 Sabine Parish (northwest)
 Natchitoches Parish (north)
 Rapides Parish (east)
 Allen Parish (southeast)
 Beauregard Parish (south)
 Newton County, Texas (west)

National protected area
 Kisatchie National Forest (part)

Demographics

2020 census

As of the 2020 United States census, there were 48,750 people, 17,696 households, and 12,375 families residing in the parish.

2010 census
As of the census of 2010, there were 52,334 people living in the parish. The population density was 39.4 people per square mile (15/km2). The racial makeup of the parish was 75.70% White, 14.2% Black or African American, 1.4% Native American, 1.8% Asian, 0.50% Pacific Islander, and 4.1% from two or more races. 7.2% of the population were Hispanic or Latino of any race.

In the parish the population was spread out, with 9.2% under 5 years of age, 27.7% under the age of 18, and 9.4% who were 65 years of age or older. Vernon parish residents are 48.8% female and 51.2% male.

There were 18,590 households, with an average household size of 2.644. The median income for a household in the parish was $42,322. The per capita income for the parish was $14,036. About 16.2% of the population were below the poverty line, including 18.60% of those under age 18 and 14.80% of those age 65 or over.

Education

Primary and secondary education
All public schools in Vernon Parish are operated by the Vernon Parish School Board, which operates 18 public schools and one optional school.

Schools providing a secondary education include:
 Evans High School (Grades PK-12)
 Hicks High School (Grades PK-12)
 Hornbeck High School (Grades PK-12)
 Pitkin High School (Grades PK-12)
 Simpson High School (Grades PK-12)
 Anacoco High School (Grades 7–12)
 Pickering High School (Grades 7–12)
 Rosepine Junior/Senior High School (Grades 7–12)
 Leesville High School (Grades 9–12)
 Vernon Parish Optional School (Grades 7–12)
 Faith training Christian academy (private k4-12)

Colleges and universities
The Louisiana Technical College (LTC) system operates the Lamar Salter campus south of New Llano. The Central Louisiana Technical College Lamar Salter campus is one of 40 LTC campuses across the state.

Northwestern State University (NSU), is a four-year public university primarily situated in Natchitoches, Louisiana and is part of the University of Louisiana System. The NSU-Leesville/Fort Polk Campus is located on Highway 467 near Fort Polk. It serves the civilian communities of Vernon, Beauregard, and Sabine parishes, as well as the military community at Fort Polk.
http://leesville.nsula.edu/

The Fort Polk Education Center offers self-development opportunities for Service members, military family members, Department of the Defense employees, military Retirees, Department of Defense contractors, and civilians from the local community in the classroom, distance learning, and online environments. Civilian students coming to the post for classes are required to use the main entrance located off U.S. Highway 171.

Central Michigan University (CMU) operates a campus at Fort Polk.

Central Texas College (CTC) is a public, open-admission community college offering associate degrees and certificate programs in academic, professional and vocational/technical fields. Due to its proximity to Fort Polk, CTC has evolved from a small junior college into a college catering to the military. CTC also help students transition from a 2-year to a 4-year degree through numerous articulation agreements with 4-year institutions nationwide.

Louisiana State University offers a Master of Arts in Liberal Arts.

The Upper Iowa University (UIU) at Fort Polk offers classes on post to both military personnel and civilians in the area. It was opened in 1995 and offers bachelor's degrees in nine majors. Courses can also be blended with UIU distance learning programs (online and independent study) to complete 11 other majors. Certificate programs are also available. UIU offers courses on post during five eight-week terms during the academic year. All courses are offered during the evenings and on weekends.

Public libraries
The Vernon Parish Library operates public libraries. It operates the main library and the Dunbar Branch Library in Leesville and the Pitkin Branch Library in Pitkin.

National Guard
The Louisiana Army National Guard maintains a maintenance facility which services its vehicles on Fort Polk.
3-156 IB part of 256th Tiger Brigade is located at Fort Polk.

Communities

Cities 
 DeRidder (most of DeRidder is in Beauregard Parish, with a very small portion reaching into Vernon)
 Leesville (parish seat and largest municipality)

Towns 
 Hornbeck
 New Llano
 Rosepine

Villages 
 Anacoco
 Simpson

Unincorporated areas

Census-designated places 
 Fort Polk North
 Fort Polk South
 Pitkin

Unincorporated communities 

 Burr Ferry
 Caney
 Coopers
 Cravens
 Evans
 Fullerton
 Hawthorne
 Hicks
 Hutton
 Kurthwood
 Lacamp
 Leander
 Pickering
 Sandy Hill
 Slagle
 Standard
 Temple

Notable people

 Bert A. Adams, state representative from Vernon Parish from 1956 to 1968
 James Armes, state representative for Beauregard and Vernon parishes since 2008; landscape contractor in Leesville
 Walter O. Bigby, Louisiana state representative from Bossier Parish from 1968 to 1979, known as "Dean of the House".
 Allen Bradley, DeRidder lawyer and businessman who represented Vernon and Beauregard parishes in the Louisiana House of Representatives from 1984 to 1992
 Eddie Fuller – National Football League player, running back with the Buffalo Bills, also played for Louisiana State University and was part of the play which became known as the "Earthquake game".
 Frank A. Howard, former Vernon Parish sheriff and Republican member of the Louisiana House of Representatives from Vernon, Sabine, Red River, and De Soto parishes.
 Claude Anthony "Buddy" Leach, Jr. – Politician, former member of the United States House of Representatives, Louisiana House of Representatives, and Louisiana Democratic state chairman
 Kevin Mawae – National Football League All-Pro Center for the Tennessee Titans
 Demond Mallet – Professional basketball player, guard. Played in the German League and currently with Spanish Joventut Badalona.
 Jim McCrery, Republican former U.S. Representative for Louisiana's 4th congressional district, was born in Shreveport, but reared in Leesville, where he graduated from Leesville High School in 1967. 
 Jewel Prestage, first African-American woman to earn a PhD in political science, former Dean of the School of Public Policy and Urban Affairs at Southern University.
 Charles M. Poston, Sr., of Hornbeck, was a Louisiana state senator, 1960–1964; father of Bryan A. Poston.
 Bryan A. Poston, member of the Louisiana State Senate from 1964 to 1992, was a Hornbeck businessman.
 D'Anthony Smith – National Football League player, Chicago Bears. Born in Berlin, Germany, he lived as a teen in Leesville while family was stationed at Fort Polk. Attended Pickering High School in Leesville and played collegiate football at Louisiana Tech University.

Politics

See also

 National Register of Historic Places listings in Vernon Parish, Louisiana

References

External links
 Snead, J., P. V. Heinrich, and R. P. McCulloh, 2002a, De Ridder 30 x 60 minute geologic quadrangle. Louisiana Geological Survey, Baton Rouge, Louisiana.
 Snead, J., P. V. Heinrich, and R. P. McCulloh, 2002b, Ville Platte 30 x 60 minute geologic quadrangle. Louisiana Geological Survey, Baton Rouge, Louisiana.
 Vernon Parish Sheriff's Office

 
Louisiana parishes
1871 establishments in Louisiana
Populated places established in 1871